Simone Jari Finn, Baroness Finn ( Kubes; born 10 June 1968) is a businesswoman and British-American Conservative politician who served as acting, de facto Downing Street Chief of Staff from July to September 2022 and Downing Street deputy chief of staff from February 2021 until the end of the second Johnson Ministry.

A member of the House of Lords since 2015, she is a former government adviser on industrial relations, efficiency and civil service reform. She co-founded Francis Maude Associates, a consultancy firm specialising in government efficiency. She was appointed a non-executive board member for the Cabinet Office in May 2020.

Early life and education 
Simone Kubes was born in the US to a Welsh mother and a father who had defected from Communist Czechoslovakia. She grew up in Swansea and attended her local comprehensive school. She graduated from Lady Margaret Hall, Oxford University, with a degree in history. Being born in the U.S. to non-diplomats, Finn is a natural-born citizen of the United States, and inherited her mother's British nationality.

Career 
Following university Finn trained and worked as an accountant at Coopers & Lybrand (subsequently PwC). She then joined the Financial Services Authority as a senior accountant regulating insurance companies.

Recruited before the 2010 election by the Conservative Party's Implementation Team, Finn became the Coalition Government's industrial relations adviser. She played a key role in negotiations with the trade unions and helped to agree deals to roughly halve the cost of public sector pensions. The Telegraph described her as the "silk-and-steel adviser behind the Coalition's trade union reforms".

As a special adviser to Francis Maude, the minister for the Cabinet Office, Finn helped to drive through his cuts of several billion pounds over the course of the 2010-2015 parliament. Finn also helped to set up the Centre for Public Appointments in the Cabinet Office and publish a diversity strategy to encourage more women to apply for public appointments. The proportion of women appointed to the boards of public bodies reached 48.2% in 2015–16 compared with 34.7% in 2009–10.

In July 2022, the resignation of Sajid Javid during the July 2022 United Kingdom government crisis caused a vacancy in the office of Secretary of State for Health and Social Care, which Downing Street chief of staff Steve Barclay was appointed to fill shortly before Boris Johnson's resignation as prime minister. While no successor to Barclay was formally appointed, Finn held the role in a de facto, acting capacity, as incumbent Downing Street deputy chief of staff.

Political candidate
In the run up to the 2015 general election, Finn was considered as a Conservative candidate for the Kensington constituency. The selected candidate, Victoria Borwick, won the seat, but lost it to the Labour Party in the 2017 election.

In 2018, Finn was included on the longlist for the Conservative Party London mayoral candidate. Shaun Bailey was selected as the final candidate.

Elevation to the Lords
In the 2015 Dissolution Honours Finn was elevated to the Lords as Baroness Finn, of Swansea in the County of West Glamorgan. In her maiden speech in the House of Lords, Finn focused on the importance of education as a tool of social mobility, paying tribute to her former deputy headmistress, Iris Williams. She also voiced her support for the Tidal Lagoon Swansea Bay, a project for which she has repeatedly advocated.

Finn is a member of the EU Security and Justice Sub-Committee. She was previously a member of the Scrutiny of Secondary Legislation Select Committee, and the EU (External Affairs) Sub Committee.

Career outside Parliament
Finn is the co-founder and managing director of Francis Maude Associates, which she runs with Lord (Francis) Maude of Horsham. It is a consulting firm specialising in government efficiency and reform, with its work based on Maude and Finn's experience in the Cabinet Office, 2010–15. She is also employed by Arbuthnot Latham, a bank owned by the former Conservative donor, Henry Angest.

Finn is a trustee of the think tank Demos and was visiting parliamentary fellow at St Anthony's, Oxford, 2017–18. She is also a board member of the Conservative Foundation.

In May 2020, Michael Gove, the minister for the Cabinet Office, appointed Finn as a non-executive board member for the Cabinet Office, serving on the audit and risk committee. On 13 February 2021 it was announced that Finn had been promoted to become Downing Street Deputy chief of staff under Dan Rosenfield.

Personal life
Finn was formerly in a relationship with Michael Gove.

She is married to Alex Finn. They have two children.

References

1968 births
Living people
Alumni of Lady Margaret Hall, Oxford
Conservative Party (UK) life peers
Place of birth missing (living people)
Life peeresses created by Elizabeth II
British special advisers